Orchid Digest is a grower's magazine about orchidology.

References 

Publications about orchids